Snoo may refer to:
Snoo, the mascot of the website Reddit
The Snoo, drummer otherwise known as Tré Cool
Snoo Wilson (1948–2013), English playwright, screenwriter and director
Laura De Snoo (born 1962), American discus thrower